Luca Udvardy (born 4 November 2005) is a Hungarian junior female tennis player.

Udvardy has a career high ITF junior combined ranking of 14 achieved on 31 October 2022.

Udvardy made her WTA main draw debut at the 2021 Budapest Grand Prix, where she received a wildcard to the doubles main draw.

Her older sister Panna is also a professional tennis player.

ITF Finals

Doubles: 1 (1 title)

Junior Grand Slam tournament finals

Singles: 1 (1 runner-up)

ITF Junior Circuit finals

Singles: 7 (2–5)

Doubles: 15 (10–5)

References

External links
 
 

2005 births
Living people
Hungarian female tennis players
21st-century Hungarian women